The 2022 Bay Cities FC season was the club's first professional season and its first in the National Independent Soccer Association, one of the two third divisions in American soccer. The club's first match was on February 22, and on March 26 was the club's first competitive game. The club played in NISA until August 26, when financial difficulties forced the club to prematurely end the season.

Background 
Bay Cities FC announced it's intention to play in the National Independent Soccer Association in April 2021. Following participation in the league's 2021 Independent Cup, finishing with a record of 0-1-1, the team was officially accepted into NISA for the 2022 season.

The team's first home game at Sequoia High School Stadium was a preseason friendly against Liga MX side Club Tijuana' Under-23 team. After trailing by two goals, Josiah Romero scored twice in the second half with the game ending in a draw, 2–2, in front of over 1,000 spectators.

Season Squad

Transfers

Transfers out

Friendlies

Competitions

National Independent Soccer Association

Standings — West Division

Results summary

Match results

U.S. Open Cup 

As a National Independent Soccer Association club, Bay Cities FC made its Open Cup debut in the Second Round.

Notes

References

External links 
 

Bay Cities FC
Bay Cities FC
Bay Cities